Anderson Grasiane de Mattos Silva, better known as Anderson (born August 26, 1982, Itaperuna, Brazil), is a Brazilian footballer who acts as a defender for Olaria.

Career
Played by Ceará since 2009.

Honours
Fluminense
Campeonato Carioca: 2012
Campeonato Brasileiro Série A: 2012

Contract
 Ceará.

References

External links
 

1981 births
Living people
Itaperuna
Brazilian footballers
Association football defenders
Campeonato Brasileiro Série A players
Campeonato Brasileiro Série B players
Americano Futebol Clube players
Volta Redonda FC players
Sociedade Esportiva do Gama players
Ceará Sporting Club players
Atlético Clube Goianiense players
Fluminense FC players
Nova Iguaçu Futebol Clube players
Botafogo Futebol Clube (PB) players
Vila Nova Futebol Clube players
Tombense Futebol Clube players
Olaria Atlético Clube players
People from Itaperuna